Matthew Kenneth Bulman (born 14 October 1986) is an association footballer playing as a goalkeeper for Oxford City. He has previously played for Forest Green Rovers, Swindon Town and Salisbury City.

Career
Bulman began his career in the youth system at Swindon Town, progressing into the first team where he made one senior appearance in an FA Cup tie on 16 November 2005 against Boston United, replacing the dismissed Tom Heaton and saving a penalty from Jason Lee with his first touch. He left the club in June 2006 and joined Salisbury City the following month.

After a season with Salisbury, Bulman moved on to the first of two spells at Cirencester Town. He left the club at the end of the 2007–2008 season to join Swindon Supermarine. In the summer of 2010 he returned to Cirencester Town.

In May 2011, Bulman signed for Conference National side Forest Green Rovers. He made his debut for the club on 12 August 2011 in a live televised fixture against Stockport County. In December 2012, Bulman signed a contract extension with the club. In November 2013, he joined Southern Premier Division side Chippenham Town on a month-long loan deal. He kept a clean sheet on his first appearance for the club on 9 November 2013 in a 1–0 home win over Cambridge City. On 31 January 2013, he left Forest Green after mutually agreeing to terminate his contract.

In February 2014, Bulman joined Worcester City. Just a month later however he left the club without making any appearances and joined league rivals Oxford City. He made his debut on 15 March 2014 in a 2–1 defeat against Boston United.

References

External links
Swindon Town profile
Cirencester Town profile
Swindon Supermarine profile

1986 births
Living people
Footballers from Bristol
English footballers
Association football goalkeepers
Swindon Town F.C. players
Salisbury City F.C. players
Cirencester Town F.C. players
Swindon Supermarine F.C. players
Forest Green Rovers F.C. players
Worcester City F.C. players
Chippenham Town F.C. players
Oxford City F.C. players
North Leigh F.C. players
National League (English football) players
Southern Football League players